The Manxman  is a 1929 British silent romance film directed by Alfred Hitchcock and starring Anny Ondra, Carl Brisson and Malcolm Keen. The film is based on a popular 1894 romantic novel The Manxman by Hall Caine, which had previously been made into a film 13 years earlier. It was the last fully silent production that Hitchcock directed before he made the transition to sound film with his next film Blackmail (1929).

Cast
 Carl Brisson as Pete Quilliam
 Malcolm Keen as Philip Christian
 Anny Ondra as Kate Cregeen
 Randle Ayrton as Caesar Cregeen
 Clare Greet as Mother (as Claire Greet)
 Harry Terry as Man (uncredited)
 Kim Peacock as Ross Christian (uncredited)
 Wilfred Shine as Doctor (uncredited)
 Nellie Richards as Wardress (uncredited)

Plot

The film tells the story of two close childhood friends, a handsome but poor fisherman, Pete Quilliam (Carl Brisson), and a well-educated middle-class lawyer, Philip Christian (Malcolm Keen); Both the young men are smitten with beautiful and lively Kate (Anny Ondra), the pub owner's daughter. In Pete's case, Kate is also interested in him, or at least she enjoys having him as a suitor.

Pete proposes, asking Philip to make the case to Kate's dour father, Caesar Cregeen (Randle Ayrton). Cregeen refuses to consent to the marriage, because Pete is penniless. Pete decides to go to Africa to make his fortune, so he will be considered eligible to marry her, and he asks Kate if she will wait for him to return. At first she jokes around, but finally she says yes. Pete then asks Philip to take care of Kate until he returns.

In his absence, Philip starts calling on Kate almost every day. Kate and Philip become strongly attracted to one another, and start an affair while visiting an old mill.

News reaches the village that Pete has been killed in Africa. Philip and Kate are shocked but Kate is relieved to realize that they can now plan their lives together. Philip's career has been going well, and he is preparing to assume the powerful position of Deemster, the island's chief magistrate.

However, it then turns out that a dead man was misidentified as Pete, who is still alive and prospering in Africa. He lets Philip know via telegram that he is returning. Philip urges Kate not to break her promise to marry Pete, allowing him to continue with his career. Pete arrives shortly after the telegram and is extremely happy to be back to his village and see his old sweetheart. Old Caesar is now delighted to agree to Kate marrying Pete. The wedding reception is celebrated in the old mill, where Old Caesar sternly warns the newlyweds to remember that God will punish anyone who violates the vows of marriage.

Kate is still in love with Philip, and can hardly bear to be married to Pete.

As the weeks pass, Pete is thrilled to find out that Kate is pregnant, and he naturally assumes he is the father. When Kate's daughter is born, Kate is desperate and decides to leave Pete. She walks out, leaving her baby behind, and a note saying that she had loved another man, and still loves him. Pete is deeply hurt by this, but puts on a brave face and tells the villagers that Kate has gone to London for a short rest. During the weeks she is gone, Pete proves himself to be a wonderful father, taking care of the baby very well, and comforting himself by believing that although Kate has gone, he still has their baby to love.

Kate persuades Philip to hide her at his law offices, hoping she can still somehow have a life with him. However, Philip is about to become the Deemster, and he is unwilling to ruin his career by running off with her. Frustrated and distraught, Kate returns to the house to take the baby. She tells Pete he is not the baby's father. Pete is stunned and refuses to believe her. He also refuses to give up the child. In desperation, Kate leaves the house and tries to commit suicide by throwing herself off the quay, but is rescued by a policeman. Attempted suicide is classified as a crime, and Kate is brought to trial on the first day that Philip serves as Deemster. Now Philip is stunned and hardly knows what to do. When Pete appears in the courtroom to plead for his wife, Philip agrees to hand Kate over to him. But Kate refuses to go. Kate's father, Old Caesar, who is watching carefully, finally understands that Kate and Philip had an affair. Philip publicly admits his extreme moral failings. He removes his wig and surrenders his official position, and then leaves the court.

In the final scene, Philip and Kate arrive at Pete's house to take away the baby. Kate picks up the child, while Philip and Pete stand at opposite ends of the room. She brings the child over to Pete to say one last goodbye, and he breaks down. Philip and Kate leave the cottage to the jeers and condemnation of the villagers, who have been watching the scene through the windows.

Having lost everything, Pete sets sail again.

Production
The Manxman began filming on the Isle of Man, but Hitchcock eventually relocated production to Polperro, Cornwall due to frequent creative interference from author Hall Caine, who lived on the Isle of Man. Other scenes were shot at British International Pictures' Elstree Studios, to which Caine was invited to observe. The director began work on the film just two weeks after the birth of his daughter Patricia Hitchcock.

Preservation and home video status
A restoration of The Manxman was completed in 2012 as part of the BFI's £2 million "Save the Hitchcock 9" project to restore all of the director's surviving silent films.

Like Hitchcock's other British films, all of which are copyrighted worldwide, The Manxman has been heavily bootlegged on home video. Various licensed, restored releases have appeared on DVD, Blu-ray and video on demand services from Optimum in the UK, Lionsgate and Kino Lorber in the US, and many others.

At the end of 2024, The Manxman will enter the public domain in the United States but only in its non-restored, scoreless form. It will remain copyrighted in the rest of the world until the end of 2050.

References

External links
 
 
 The Manxman at the British Film Institute's Screenonline
 Alfred Hitchcock Collectors’ Guide: The Manxman at Brenton Film

1929 films
Films based on British novels
Films directed by Alfred Hitchcock
British black-and-white films
Films shot at British International Pictures Studios
British silent feature films
British drama films
Manx culture
Films set on the Isle of Man
Films set in the British Empire
Films shot in England
1929 drama films
Remakes of British films
1920s English-language films
1920s British films
Silent drama films